AISL may refer to

Association Internationale Albert Schweitzer
American Indoor Soccer League was a semi-professional indoor soccer league 2003-2008
Argentina Improving Spanish Language
American International School of Lagos
American International School of Libreville
American International School of Lomé